Ruby Dome is the highest mountain in both the Ruby Mountains and Elko County, in Nevada, United States. It is the twenty-seventh-highest mountain in the state, and also ranks as the thirteenth-most topographically prominent peak in the state. It is the highest mountain for over 90 miles in all directions.

References

External links
 
 Trail information for Ruby Dome. Backpacking In The Ruby Mountains.com.
 

Mountains of Elko County, Nevada
Ruby Mountains
Mountains of Nevada
Humboldt–Toiyabe National Forest